Suhag Raat is a significant ritual in the life of a newly wedded couple in the Indian subcontinent, and refers to the first night when the marriage is consummated. The bed of the newlywed couple is decorated with flowers, which are believed to bring sweetness to their relationship. This is an important custom followed in Vedic Hindu marriages. The tradition also extends to Jains, Buddhist, Sikhs and South Asian Muslims. In some areas, especially in West Bengal and Orissa, "Suhag Raat" is also referred to as "Fourth Night" because this ritual is observed on the fourth night of marriage, of the wedding.

Custom
The female members of the bridegroom's family customarily guide the bride to the decorated bedroom where she waits for her husband's arrivaloptionally, with a glass of milk.
 The couple's bed is decorated with roses, marigold, jasmine and rajnigandha flowers. It is traditional for the groom to wait outside with the relatives and family for some time before he joins the bride in the decorated bedroom. The bride supposedly waits for her husband behind a veil ("ghoonghat"). The husband slowly takes the veil off to reveal the bride's face in a ritual called "Muh Dekhai" i.e. showing of bride's face. After consummation, the wife is also known as "Ardhangini" in Hindu Philosophy. It is customary that the couple wakes up early next morning before anyone else, bathe, and change their clothing. The clothing worn the previous night is considered dirty and so the dhobi customarily arrives the next morning to collect them for cleaning. The Suhag Raat may extend to a honeymoon tour.
However couple behavior may differ in some religions.

References

Vedic customs
Hindu traditions
Marriage in Hinduism